Liminal BioSciences Inc., formerly known as Prometic Life Sciences Inc., is a Canadian biopharmaceutical company. The company is publicly traded on the Nasdaq Global Market.

History

Liminal was founded in 1988, as a commercial spinoff of research at the University of Cambridge on affinity chromatography.  Its founder was the current President and CEO, Pierre Laurin, whose research formed the basis for the company's products.  On May 19, 1998, the Corporation went public through a listing on the Toronto Stock Exchange.

In August 2016, the company announced the acquisition of Telesta Therapeutics.

Business

Most of the company's products are based on its affinity chromatography process.  One use of this process is the purification of drugs, reducing impurities and thus side effects.  A second use is removing pathogens from human blood; in 2002, Liminal formed a joint venture with the American Red Cross to remove pathogens and viruses from collected blood. A third application is to extract and purify therapeutic proteins from human plasma, which are then used in the creation of therapeutics and orphan drugs.

Liminal has two business segments: the protein technologies segment and the small-molecule therapeutics segment.

The small-molecule therapeutics segment produces products for sufferers of fibrosis, cancer and autoimmune diseases.  The company's most prominent product is PBI-4050, an anti-fibrosis product.

Headquartered in Laval, Quebec, Liminal has:

Research and development facilities in the UK, the US and Canada
Manufacturing facilities in the UK and Canada

It also conducts business development activities in the US, Europe and Asia. As of 2015, it has approximately 250 employees.

Controversies 
From early 2018 to early 2019, Prometic Life Sciences' Share price dropped 79%. Prometic responded with a dilutitive restructuring of the company, a move which wiped out most of their shareholder's equity. The company's shareholders were denied a say in the matter after Prometic sought permission from the Toronto Stock Exchange to proceed without a shareholder vote for reasons of "financial hardship". In October 2019, the company allowed its shareholders to vote on a name change.

References

External links

Companies formerly listed on the Toronto Stock Exchange
Companies listed on the Nasdaq
Life sciences industry
Orphan drug companies
Companies based in Laval, Quebec